Bafoi (also Bafoi Kanai, Bafai Gora) is a village in Kanai district of Zangon Kataf Local Government Area in southern Kaduna state in the Middle Belt region of Nigeria. The postal code of the area is 802145.

Settlements
 Before 2017, it used to be a district of its own. However, it was later merged with Kanai district. Among the settlements in this district were:
 Ayak
 Aza Magoni
 Azambat
 Bafoi (also Sanai)
 Chen Didan
 Ma-Avwuong
 Makura

See also
 Atyap chiefdom
 List of villages in Kaduna State

References

Populated places in Kaduna State